Hero is a 2019 Burmese romantic action film, directed by R. Perekas starring Myint Myat, Wutt Hmone Shwe Yi, Khin Hlaing and Nay Naw. The film, produced by Lucky Seven Film Production premiered in Myanmar on November 21, 2019.

Cast
Myint Myat as Thiha
Wutt Hmone Shwe Yi as Wutyi
Khin Hlaing as Thomas
Zin Wine as Father of Wutyi
Win Myaing as Uncle of Wutyi
Nay Naw as Thein Lay
Sarah Song Oo as Mee Mee
Helan Susan as Kyi Pyar
Kyaw Zin Htut as Pyae Sone

References

2019 films
2010s Burmese-language films
Burmese action films
Films shot in Myanmar